The Connecticut field pumpkin (C. pepo) is a type of pumpkin. It is an heirloom variety, the "standard" and "classic" pumpkin, "one of the oldest pumpkins in existence". Widely used for autumn decorations, either whole or as jack-o'-lanterns, it is also suitable for culinary purposes.  Said to differ little from winter squash grown by Native Americans in pre-Columbian times, the name "Connecticut field" references the area where the ancestral variety was found, as well as the traditional system of planting pumpkins in corn fields.

Like most pumpkins, the Connecticut field pumpkin is large, round, and orange, with smooth, slightly ribbed skin.

The "New England pie pumpkin", also known as the "small sugar pumpkin", which is smaller in size but considered to have superior cooking properties, is said to be taken from a strain of this cultivar. The Howden pumpkin is a strain selected from Connecticut field pumpkins for improved production and uniformity of fruits, and is described as "the original commercial jack-o’-lantern pumpkin".

References

Squashes and pumpkins
Food plant cultivars